There are several buildings called the Standard & Poors Building in New York City:

 55 Water Street, the current headquarters of Standard & Poor's
 65 Broadway, also called the American Express Building
 25 Broadway, also called the Cunard Building

S&P Global